"You Did Cut Me" is a song by China Crisis. It was released as the third single from their 1985 album Flaunt the Imperfection and reached number 54 on the UK Singles Chart.

The b-side of the single is a live version of the song. It was also released as a 7" double pack and a 12" single including additional live tracks.

References

China Crisis songs
1985 songs